The Gentry Grand Army of the Republic Memorial is an American Civil War monument in the northeast section of Gentry Cemetery in Gentry, Arkansas.  It is a limestone structure with Classical Revival features, consisting of a stepped square base, a tier of marble panels framed by round columns, and a tapered obelisk topped by a carved capital and round knob.  Two of the marble panels are inscribed with the names of soldiers who served in the Union Army.  The monument was installed in 1918 through the efforts of David Kost, a Civil War veteran who organized Gentry's chapter of the Grand Army of the Republic (GAR).  It is one of a relatively small number of GAR memorials in the state (as compared to a larger number of Confederate memorials).

The monument was listed on the National Register of Historic Places in 2016.

See also
National Register of Historic Places listings in Benton County, Arkansas

References

1918 sculptures
Arkansas
Monuments and memorials on the National Register of Historic Places in Arkansas
National Register of Historic Places in Benton County, Arkansas
Neoclassical architecture in Arkansas
1918 establishments in Arkansas
Union (American Civil War) monuments and memorials
Arkansas in the American Civil War
Gentry, Arkansas